Poet Anderson ...of Nightmares is Tom DeLonge's first novel, written in collaboration with New York Times bestselling author Suzanne Young. The novel was published in October 2015 by To the Stars. It is the first book of the upcoming Poet Anderson trilogy.

Synopsis
Jonas Anderson and his older brother Alan are Lucid Dreamers. But after a car accident lands Alan in a coma, Jonas sets out into the Dream World in an attempt to find his brother and wake him up. What he discovers instead is an entire shared consciousness where fear comes to life as a snarling beast called a Night Terror, and a creature named REM is bent on destruction and misery, devouring the souls of the strongest dreamers. With the help of a Dream Walker—a guardian of the dreamscape, Jonas must face his fears, save his brother, and become who he was always meant to be: Poet Anderson.

Characters
 The novel's protagonist, who is a lucid dreamer and who is trying to find his brother Alan in The Dream World to wake him up from a coma
 Jonas's older brother, also a lucid dreamer
 Jonas's love interest and classmate
 Sam's dad. Owner of Eden Hotel
 Poet's Dream Walker 
 Guardians of The Dream World. 
 Main antagonist. Controls Night Stalkers. 
 Corrupted souls of those killed by REM.

Reception
Book has received mostly positive reviews, resulting in overall score of 4.1 on Goodreads and a score of 4.6 on Amazon.

Consequence of Sound called the book "a blend between Harry Potter and The Matrix".

Audiobook
In 2017 Tantor Media released ...of Nightmarres in audiobook format, narrated by Liam Gerrard.  The title has received critical acclaim and achieved 4.5 star ratings out of 5 on Audible.

Film Adaptation
To The Stars has partnered with RatPac to bring Poet Anderson  to big screens. It is hoped the movie's budget might reach $100m.

DeLonge is also filming a short feature film with Tyler Posey and Dylan Sprayberry

Footnotes

2015 American novels
American young adult novels
2015 debut novels